K30 may refer to:
 K-30 (Kansas highway)
 K30 Biho, a South Korean self-propelled anti-aircraft weapon
 K-30 truck, an American military truck
 Cat fugue by Domenico Scarlatti
 Pentax K-30, a digital camera
 Redmi K30, a smartphones
 Sonata in F, K. 30, by Wolfgang Amadeus Mozart